North Waterford is a village in the town of Waterford in Oxford County, Maine.

References

Villages in Maine
Villages in Oxford County, Maine